Jacques Zon (21 April 1872, The Hague – 27 March 1932, The Hague), or Jacob Abraham Zon was a Dutch painter. Zon received drawing and painting lessons from Dutch landscape painter Willem Maris. He also worked in the studio of French painter Fernand Cormon.

Gallery

References

External links
Jacob Abraham (Jacques) Zon at artnet.com

1872 births
1932 deaths
20th-century Dutch painters
Dutch male painters
Artists from The Hague
20th-century Dutch male artists